The 1960 Mississippi State Maroons football team represented Mississippi State University during the 1960 NCAA University Division football season.

Schedule

References

Mississippi State
Mississippi State Bulldogs football seasons
Mississippi State Maroons football